The University of Arts, formerly known as the Academy of Arts is a public university and the main institution that offers higher education of the arts in Albania.

History
Founded in 1966 as the Higher Institute of Arts, it merged three artistic institutions: the Tirana State Conservatory, the Higher School of Fine Arts, and the High School for Actors “Aleksander Moisiu”. The institute was able to take advantage of the Russian tradition in classical music and ballet due to the fact that Albania and Russia had close relationships during communism. The school still maintains ties with the Russian School of Ballet and Classical Music. In 1991, the Higher Institute of Arts was promoted to university level and renamed Academy of Arts. On October 12, 2009, the President of Albania, Bamir Topi awarded the Academy of Arts the "Grand Master Order".

Academics
The Academy of Arts has three faculties:
 Faculty of Music. It offers majors in musicology, conducting, composition, piano, violin, viola, cello, double bass, guitar, flute, oboe, clarinet, trombone, trumpet, accordion, bassoon, horn, tuba, canto, and pedagogy, and has two academic departments
 Musicology/Composition/Conducting Department
 Performing Department
 Faculty of Visual Arts. It offers majors in painting, graphics, textile and fashion design, multimedia, applied design, sculpture, and ceramics, and has two academic departments:
 Painting Department
 Sculpture Department
 Faculty of Dramatic Arts. It offers majors in movie and TV directing, acting, stage design and costumography, and choreography, and has two academic departments:
 Acting Department
 Directing/Stage/Design/Choreography/Art Theory Department

The artists trained in the institution have become well known in dance, music, theatre, film, and television in Albania and abroad. The teaching staff and associates of the Art Academy are musicologists, instrument players, painters, sculptors, theatre, film, and television directors, actors, stage designers, and choreographers.

Directors/Rectors 
From its creation until 1991 the Higher Institute of Arts was led by a Director. From 1997 to the present, it is directed by a Rector.

Notable alumni

 Mirjam Tola (soprano)
 Inva Mula (opera)
 Ermonela Jaho (opera)
 Pirro Çako (conducting)
 Jonida Maliqi (canto)
 Edi Rama (visual arts)
 Anri Sala (visual arts)
 Helidon Gjergji (visual arts)
 Vénera Kastrati (visual arts)
 Altin Kaftira (ballet)
 Kledi Kadiu (ballet)
 Yllka Mujo (acting)
 Ndriçim Xhepa (acting)
 Luli Bitri (acting)
 Rajmonda Bulku (acting)
 Laert Vasili (acting)
 Arta Muçaj (acting)
 Aurela Gaçe (acting)
 Nik Xhelilaj (acting)
 Artan Imami (acting)
 Julian Deda (acting)
 Bleona (acting)
 Qëndrim Rijani (directing)
 Gent Bejko (directing)

Postage stamp
 On December 15, 2011, to celebrate the 45th anniversary of the Academy of Arts, the Albanian Post issued a new postal stamp  dedicated to this event. The stamp was introduced during a ceremony at the Main Hall of the University of Arts by the Head of the Philately Department of the Albanian Posts and the Rector Prof. Petrit Malaj.

See also
 List of universities in Albania
 Quality Assurance Agency of Higher Education
 List of colleges and universities
 List of colleges and universities by country
 National Theatre of Opera and Ballet of Albania
 Palace of Culture of Tirana
 National Gallery of Figurative Arts of Albania
 National Theater of Albania

References

External links
 Official Website

University of Arts, Tirana
Universities and colleges in Tirana
Music schools in Albania
Educational institutions established in 1966
1966 establishments in Albania